Werner Willikens (8 February 1893 in Vienenburg – 25 October 1961 in Wolfenbüttel) was a German politician with the Nazi Party. His phrase "working towards the Führer", which he used in a 1934 speech, has become a common description of Nazi bureaucracy in literature.

Biography
Willikens enrolled in the German Imperial Army in 1912 and served in World War I as a battery commander.

An early Nazi Party member, he was farmer by profession and organised the first training course for Nazi farmers in 1926. Willikens was a member of the Reichstag from electoral constituency 16 (South Hanover-Brunswick), elected  as one of the first 12 Nazi deputies in 1928 and retaining his seat until the fall of the Third Reich.

In 1930, Willikens was appointed deputy chairman of Agrarpolitischer Apparat, Agricultural Affairs Bureau of the NSDAP and also chaired the Agrarian League. His appointment to the national executive of the Reichslandbund in 1930 was the first time that the highly conservative group - up to that point firmly linked to the German National People's Party - had given a position of influence to a Nazi. After Adolf Hitler came to power Willikens was appointed as a State Secretary in the Agriculture Ministry.

Ian Kershaw has argued that a speech made by Willikens in 1934, in particular his use of the phrase "working towards the Führer", was important in laying the framework for the Holocaust. Kershaw argued that the speech recognised the aloofness of Hitler's charismatic leadership and thus encouraged officials to second-guess Hitler's wishes and act accordingly. Kershaw suggests that Adolf Eichmann's rise from minor functionary to a leading role in the SS was built on this principle of "working towards the Führer". Indeed, such was Kershaw's use of Willikens' phrase that his tribute book even bore it as a title. The speech itself was made in Berlin on 21 February 1934 to representatives of the regional agriculture ministries.

References

External links
 

1893 births
1961 deaths
People from Goslar (district)
Nazi Party politicians
Members of the Reichstag of the Weimar Republic
Members of the Reichstag of Nazi Germany
German farmers
German Army personnel of World War I